Labeo barbatulus is a species of fish in the family Cyprinidae, the carps and minnows. It is native to the Mekong River basin in Cambodia, Laos, and Vietnam.

This fish is up to 30 centimeters long and dark brown or black in color, with fringed lips.

The fish occurs in the Mekong River and its tributaries, but its true distribution and population sizes are not known. It lives in deep pools most of the year, and migrates during the rainy season. It spawns in the tributaries in July and August.

The species may be impacted to some extent by dams and overfishing, but conservation data is lacking.

References 

Labeo
Fish of the Mekong Basin
Fish described in 1878